The Cebu–Bohol Bridge is a proposed bridge which will connect the island provinces of Cebu and Bohol in the Philippines. The construction cost is estimated to be around ₱90 billion.

History

Cebu-Bohol Friendship Bridge 
The bridge would be proposed back in mid-2016. It has been one of the listed projects in Duterte's Build! Build! Build! and, later, Bongbong Marcos' Build Better More infrastructure programs. The National Economic Development Authority (NEDA) made a proposal to connect the two provinces from Cebu City to Jetafe. The project cost was studied to be around nearly ₱58 billion. The construction was planned to start in 2020. Then after, Director-General Ernesto Pernia, claimed the project to be "impossible" due to technological limitations or "very costly", causing the project to be shelved.

Planning 
The bridge would then be planned by Cebu Governor Gwendolyn Garcia. Garcia would ask Metro Pacific Tollways Corporation (MPTC) Chairman Manuel Pangilinan, to inspect the possibility of building a bridge that will connect Cordova and Bohol. Pangilinan hinted the project cost to be around 90 billion pesos and they would have to find a way to finance the project in order to make it viable and could be raised for the feasibility study. The development would later be announced by Cebu-Cordova Link Expressway Corporation (CCLEC) President Allan Alfon.

References 

Buildings and structures in Cebu
Buildings and structures in Bohol
Bridges in the Philippines
Transportation in Cebu
Transportation in Bohol
Proposed bridges in the Philippines